NRJ Sessions: Cœur de pirate is an extended play by Canadian singer Cœur de pirate. It was released as a digital download in France on June 23, 2010. The EP features songs from Cœur de pirate's self-titled debut studio album as well as a cover version of Air's song "Playground Love".

Track listing

Charts

References

2010 EPs
Cœur de pirate albums
Live EPs
Bravo Musique EPs
2010 live albums
Bravo Musique live albums
French-language EPs
French-language live albums